Strepsinoma croesusalis is a species of moth of the family Crambidae. It was described by Francis Walker in 1859 and is found in Taiwan, China, India and  Borneo.

Subspecies
Strepsinoma croesusalis croesusalis (Borneo)
Strepsinoma croesusalis trigonalis (Swinhoe, 1895) (India)
Strepsinoma croesusalis hapilistale (Strand, 1919) (Taiwan)
Strepsinoma croesusalis angustalis (Caradja, 1925) (China: Canton)

References

Moths described in 1859
Acentropinae